Marriage is a socially or ritually recognized union, or legal contract between spouses.

Marriage may also refer to:

Film
Marriage (1927 film), an American drama film
Marriage (1928 film), an Austrian-German silent film
Marriage (1936 film), a Soviet comedy film
Marriage (1954 film), an Italian comedy film
Marriages (1998 film), an Italian film
Marriages (2001 film), a Canadian film directed by Catherine Martin
The Marriage (2017 film), a Kosovan film

Television
The Marriage (TV series), an American television series from the 1950s
Married (TV series), an American comedy series which aired from 2014 to 2015
"Marriage", an episode of Men Behaving Badly
Marriage (TV series) a British four-part series, broadcast in 2022

Literature
Marriage (novel), a 1912 novel by H. G. Wells
Marriage (play), an 1842 play by Nikolai Gogol
The Marriage (Gombrowicz play), a 1948 play by Witold Gombrowicz
"Marriage", a poem by Gregory Corso

Music
Marriages (band), a rock band from Los Angeles, California
Marriage (Attack in Black album), 2007
Marriage (Deap Vally album), 2021
Marriage (Deen album), 2012
The Marriage (opera), a 1953 opera by Bohuslav Martinů, based on Gogol's play
The Marriage (Mussorgsky) or Zhenitba, a Russian opera by Modest Mussorgsky, based on Gogol's play
"The Marriage", a song by Patrick Wolf from The Magic Position

Other uses
The Marriage (radio), an American radio series
The Marriage (video game), a 2006 art game developed by Rod Humble
Marriage (card game), a Nepali matching card game

See also
 Cohabitation
 Common-law marriage
 Interpersonal relationship
 Mariage (disambiguation)